Electrostatic levitation is the process of using an electric field to levitate a charged object and counteract the effects of gravity. It was used, for instance, in Robert Millikan's oil drop experiment and is used to suspend the gyroscopes in Gravity Probe B during launch.

Due to Earnshaw's theorem, no static arrangement of classical electrostatic fields can be used to stably levitate a point charge. There is an equilibrium point where the two fields cancel, but it is an unstable equilibrium. By using feedback techniques it is possible to adjust the charges to achieve a quasi static levitation.

Earnshaw's theorem

The idea of particle instability in an electrostatic field originated with Samuel Earnshaw in 1839 and was formalized by James Clerk Maxwell in 1874 who gave it the title "Earnshaw's theorem" and proved it with the Laplace equation. Earnshaw's theorem explains why a system of electrons is not stable and was invoked by Niels Bohr in his atom model of 1913 when criticizing J. J. Thomson's atom. 

Earnshaw's theorem holds that a charged particle suspended in an electrostatic field is unstable, because the forces of attraction and repulsion vary at an equal rate that is proportional to the inverse square law and remain in balance wherever a particle moves. Since the forces remain in balance, there is no inequality to provide a restoring force; and the particle remains unstable and can freely move without restriction.

Levitation
The first electrostatic levitator was invented by Dr. Won-Kyu Rhim at NASA's JPL lab in 1993. A charged sample of 2 mm in diameter can be levitated in a vacuum chamber between two electrodes positioned vertically with an electrostatic field in between. The field is controlled through a feedback system to keep the levitated sample at a predetermined position. Several copies of this system have been made in JAXA and NASA, and the original system has been transferred to California Institute of Technology with an upgraded setup of tetrahedra four beam laser heating system. 

On the Moon the photoelectric effect and electrons in the solar wind charge fine layers of moon dust on the surface forming an atmosphere of dust that floats in "fountains" over the surface of the moon.

See also 
 Magnetic levitation
 Optical levitation
 Acoustic levitation
 Aerodynamic levitation
 Biefeld-Brown effect
 Ionocraft (Lifter)
 Van de Graff generator

References

External links
 JLN Labs: Levitators
 Electrostatic levitator — Marshall Space Flight Center
 Electrostatic levitation raises dust particles off the surface of the moon
 Hybrid electric/acoustic levitation
 Electrostatic levitation and transportation of glass or silicon plates
 Electrostatic levitation of various materials including silicon, cobalt palladium, aluminium and other compounds

Electrostatics
Levitation